KCGM (95.7 FM), "FM 95", is a radio station licensed to serve Daniels County, Montana and surrounding area.  The station is owned by Prairie Communications, Inc. Its studios are located at 20 Main Street in Scobey. The transmitter and 400-foot tower are east of town.

It airs a community-oriented full-service Country music format.

The station was assigned the KCGM call letters by the Federal Communications Commission.

References

External links
FM 95 Online
KCGM transmitter and studio photos

CGM
Country radio stations in the United States
Daniels County, Montana
Radio stations established in 1971
1971 establishments in Montana